David Foote Rivers (July 18, 1859 – July 5, 1941) was a theologian and politician in the United States. An African American and a Republican, he served as a member of the Tennessee House of Representatives for Fayette County from 1883 to 1884. He represented Fayette County.

He taught at his alma mater, Roger Williams University, in Nashville, Tennessee. His eligibility for office was contested because he studied out of county during the year prior to his election. H. C. Jarvis submitted a minority report supporting his eligibility. He was reelected but was forced to flee the county due to rising racist violence.

Rivers became the pastor of Metropolitan Baptist church in Kansas City, Missouri in the 1890s, and he later served as the pastor of Berean Baptist Church in Washington, D.C.

His son Francis E. Rivers served in New York State's General Assembly and was an assistant district attorney.

See also
African Americans in Tennessee
African-American officeholders during and following the Reconstruction era

References

1859 births
1941 deaths
People from Fayette County, Tennessee
African-American state legislators in Tennessee
Republican Party members of the Tennessee House of Representatives
20th-century African-American people